Greta Carlsson (later Nygren, July 7, 1898 – March 19, 1980) was a Swedish freestyle swimmer who competed in the 1912 Summer Olympics.

In 1912 she was part of the Swedish team which finished fourth in the 4 x 100 metre freestyle relay event at the  1912 Summer Olympics. In the solo 100 metre freestyle competition she was eliminated in the first round.

References

Sources

1898 births
1980 deaths
Olympic swimmers of Sweden
Swimmers at the 1912 Summer Olympics
People from Eskilstuna
Swedish female freestyle swimmers
Sportspeople from Södermanland County